Classical Guarani, also known as Missionary Guarani or Old Guarani (abá ñeȇ́  'the people's language') is an extinct variant of the Guarani language. It was spoken in the region of the thirty Jesuit missions among the Guarani (current territories of Paraguay, Argentina and Brazil). The Jesuits studied the language for around 160 years, assigning it a writing system and consolidating several dialects into one unified language. Classical Guarani went extinct gradually after their suppression in 1767.

Despite its extinction, its bibliographical production and that of written documents was rich and is still mostly conserved. Therefore, it is considered an important literary branch in the history of Guarani.

Differences with Criollo Guarani 
Although Classical Guarani had an influence in Criollo Guarani, Criollo has its roots outside of the Jesuit missions. Modern scholars have shown that Guarani has always been the main language of the Jesuit Guarani missions and, later on, to the whole Governorate of Paraguay which belonged to the Viceroyalty of the Río de la Plata.

After the expulsion of the Jesuits, the residents of the reductions emigrated gradually towards territories of current Paraguay, Corrientes, Uruguay, Entre Ríos and those to the North of Río Salado. These migratory moves caused a one-sided change in the language, making it stray far from the original dialect that the Jesuits had studied.

Classical Guarani evolved in a different manner by keeping away from Hispanicisms, favoring the use of the language's agglutinative nature to coin new terms. This process would often lead to the Jesuits using more complex and synthetic terms to transmit Western concepts. Criollo Guarani, on the other hand, has been characterized by a free influx, unregulated with regards to Hispanicisms which were often incorporated with a minimal phonological adaptation. Thus, the word for communion in Classical Guarani would be Tȗpȃ́ rára whereas in Criollo Guarani it is komuño (from Spanish comunión).

Because of the emigration from the reductions, these two dialects came to a wide contact for the first time. Most speakers abandoned the Classical variant, more complicated and with more rules, in favor of the more practical Criollo.

Phonology

Consonants 
The consonant phonemes of Classical Guarani are as follows:

Vowels

Orthography 
Classical Guarani using letters from the Latin alphabet assigned to each phoneme by Jesuit missionaries.

Some of the orthographical rules are as follows:

 c is read as /k/ before a, o and u. It is read as /s/ before e and i. ç is used only before the vowels where c would otherwise be read as /k/ (ço /so/ to avoid co /ko/).
 qu is read as /k/ before e and i and as /kʷ/ before a, in which case it always forms a diphthong or triphthong (e.g. que /ke/, tequay /teˈkʷaj/).
 Syllables with ĭ and ỹ are always stressed.
 Syllables ending in ĭ and ỹ are always oxytones.
 Syllables with circumflex accents are always stressed.
 Two vowels next to each other are separated by a glottal stop unless a circumflex accent is added to form a diphthong in which case the syllable is always stressed unless specified otherwise (e.g. cue is read as /kuˈʔe/ while cuê is read as /kʷe/)
Early scholars failed to represent the glottal stop. This is due to the prevailing view at the time among scholars (which lasted until the sixties) that the glottal stop in Guarani was a suprasegmental phenomenon (hiatus, stress, syllable, etc.).

Numbers 
Classical Guarani only had four numbers on its own. Bigger numbers were introduced later on in the rest of Guarani languages.

Sometimes they used yrundĭ hae nirȗî or ace pópeteȋ́ 'one human hand' for five, ace pómȏcȏî 'two human hands' for ten and mbó mbĭ abé 'hands and also feet' or ace pó ace pĭ abé 'human hands and also human feet' for twenty.

Grammar 
Many nouns and verbs in its most basic form ("root") ended in consonants. However, the language did not allow lexemes to end in consonants. Therefore this form was never used alone by itself in speech but existed only hypothetically. It was, however, used accompanied by suffixes. For dictionaries and other books with the purpose of studying the language, this form was written with the last consonant between two full stops (e.g. tú.b. is the root, túba is the nominative).

The language had no gender and no number as well. If an emphasis was to be made, they used words such as hetá (many) or specified the cardinal number.

Example text 
Act of Contrition from Catecismo de la lengua guaraní, the first catechism in Guarani, by Friar Antonio Ruiz de Montoya.

References 

Tupi–Guarani languages
Extinct languages of South America